Tim O'Donnell (7 March 1907 – 15 July 2003) was an Irish sportsperson, also brother of legendary John Kerry O’Donnell.  He played Gaelic football with his local club Camp and was a member of the Kerry senior inter-county team from the 1929 until 1937. The Holder of 3 senior All-Ireland medals won in 1929, 1930 and 1937, sadly he lost out on two more All-Ireland wins in 1931 and 32’ due to a knee injury in 1931. In his last all-Ireland win in 1937, his knee injury that he had suffered with for so long resurfaced and he had to retire. In total he won three senior All-Ireland medals, three National leagues, five Munster championships and a Railway Cup Medal, a very successful career, creating a never ending love for Gaelic football for his family. At the time of his death O'Donnell was Kerry's oldest surviving All-Ireland medal winner. He died at the age of 96 in a Dublin hospital.

References

1907 births
2003 deaths
Camp Gaelic footballers
Garda Síochána officers
Kerry inter-county Gaelic footballers
Munster inter-provincial Gaelic footballers